

The SET 10 (unrelated to the SET X design of the same year) was a trainer aircraft produced in Romania in prototype form in the early 1930s. It was a conventional, single-bay biplane with staggered wings braced with N-struts. It was equipped with fixed tailskid undercarriage, and seated the pilot and instructor in tandem, open cockpits. Intended for Romania's aeroclubs and Air Force, no production ensued.

In 1934 the SET 10 was advertised for club trainer use with a  Walter Mars I nine-cylinder radial engine.

Specifications (Walter mars engine)

References

Further reading

External links

 Photos and drawing at Уголок неба
 Aviatia magazine website 

1930s Romanian civil trainer aircraft
1930s Romanian military trainer aircraft
S10